Primary School no. 2 in Pruszcz Gdański (Polish: Szkoła Podstawowa nr 2 w Pruszczu Gdańskim) – public school situated in Pruszcz Gdański in Pomeranian Voivodeship. The school principal is Marzena Kotecka. The patron of the school is Nicolaus Copernicus.

External links 
School website 
School group on www.szkolnictwo.pl 

Gdańsk County
Schools in Poland